Pentagonia spathicalyx is a species of flowering plant in the family Rubiaceae, native to western South America (Colombia, Ecuador and Peru) to north Brazil. It was first described by Karl Moritz Schumann in 1889.

References

spathicalyx
Flora of Colombia
Flora of Ecuador
Flora of North Brazil
Flora of Peru
Critically endangered flora of South America
Taxonomy articles created by Polbot